Vătava is a commune in Mureș County, Transylvania, Romania composed of three villages: Dumbrava (Marosliget), Râpa de Jos (Alsórépa) and Vătava. It has a population of 1,987: 91% Romanians, 6.8% Roma and 0.2% Hungarians.

International relations

Vătava was twinned with Laval, France, until 2009.

References

Communes in Mureș County
Localities in Transylvania